January Low Wye San (born 23 August 1985) is a Malaysian Indian Classical dancer of Chinese Indian descent. She specializes in the classical dance forms of Orissi and Bharathanatyam.

Dancing under the tutelage of guru Ramli Ibrahim since she was 8, she developed into a promising artist and was soon labeled his protégé.

She had her arangetram (solo graduation dance) when she was 18 and went to receive the 2003 Kakiseni Award for Best Solo Performer for her performance.

Since then she has toured around the world with the Sutra Dance Theatre, performing in Sydney, New York, Ukraine, Paris, India, Italy and Malaysia.

She also appeared in Malaysian musician Pete Teo’s national unity music video "Here in My Home last" in 2008, starring alongside 49 other personalities, including football pundit Shebby Singh, Air Asia chief executive officer Datuk Seri Tony Fernandes, model Amber Chia, comedian Harith Iskander and actors Maya Karin.

She has appeared in various magazines, most recently on the cover of Tatler Malaysia's May 2009 arts issue.

In May 2009, she resigned from Sutra Dance Theatre and is in Seoul till November as part of a residency program in conjunction with the Seoul International Dance Festival to be held in South Korea later this year.

References

Sources 
 
 
 
 

1985 births
Living people
Malaysian female dancers
Odissi exponents